Gärtner is the lava-flooded remnant of a crater in the northeast part of the Moon. It is located on the northern edge of the Mare Frigoris. The southern half of the formation is completely missing, and Gärtner forms a semi-circular basin along the edges of the lunar mare. To the north lies the crater Democritus.

The surviving parts of the crater rim are heavily worn and eroded, with notches and indentations formed by past impacts. The floor has a few low rises in the northern half. A rille designated Rima Gärtner runs from the midpoint of the crater toward the northeast rim, for a total length of about 30 kilometers. The bowl-shaped craterlet Gärtner D is located near the midpoint between the two ends of the crater rim.

Satellite craters
By convention these features are identified on lunar maps by placing the letter on the side of the crater midpoint that is closest to Gärtner.

References

 
 
 
 
 
 
 
 
 
 
 
 

Impact craters on the Moon